The Substance Abuse and Mental Health Services Administration (SAMHSA; pronounced ) is a branch of the U.S. Department of Health and Human Services. SAMHSA is charged with improving the quality and availability of treatment and rehabilitative services in order to reduce illness, death, disability, and the cost to society resulting from substance abuse and mental illnesses.  The Administrator of SAMHSA reports directly to the Secretary of the U.S. Department of Health and Human Services. SAMHSA's headquarters building is located outside of Rockville, Maryland.

History

SAMHSA was established in 1992 by Congress as part of a reorganization stemming from the abolition of Alcohol, Drug Abuse, and Mental Health Administration (ADAMHA).  ADAMHA had been established in 1973, combining the National Institute on Alcohol Abuse and Alcoholism (NIAAA), National Institute on Drug Abuse (NIDA), National Institute of Mental Health (NIMH).  The 1992 ADAMHA Reorganization Act consolidated the treatment functions that were previously scattered amongst the NIMH, NIAAA, and NIDA into SAMHSA, established as an agency of the Public Health Service (PHS). NIMH, NIAAA, and NIDA continued with their research functions as agencies within the National Institutes of Health.

Congress directed SAMHSA to target effectively substance abuse and mental health services to the people most in need and to translate research in these areas more effectively and rapidly into the general health care system.

Charles Curie was SAMHSA's Director until his resignation in May 2006. In December 2006 Terry Cline was appointed as SAMHSA's Director. Dr. Cline served through August 2008. Rear Admiral Eric Broderick served as the Acting Director upon Dr. Cline's departure, until the arrival of the succeeding Administrator, Pamela S. Hyde, J.D. in November 2009. She resigned in August 2015 and Kana Enomoto, M.A. served as Acting Director of SAMHSA until Dr. Elinore F. McCance-Katz was appointed as the inaugural Assistant Secretary for Mental Health and Substance Abuse. The title was changed by Section 6001 of the 21st Century Cures Act.

Organization

SAMHSA's mission is to reduce the impact of substance abuse and mental illness on American's communities.

Four SAMHSA offices, called Centers, administer competitive, formula, and block grant programs and data collection activities:
The Center for Mental Health Services (CMHS) focuses on prevention and treatment of mental disorders. 
The Center for Substance Abuse Prevention (CSAP) seeks to reduce the abuse of illegal drugs, alcohol, and tobacco. 
The Center for Substance Abuse Treatment (CSAT) supports effective substance abuse treatment and recovery services. 
The Center for Behavioral Health Statistics and Quality (CBHSQ) collects, analyzes, and publishes behavior health data.

The Centers give grant and contracts to U.S. states, territories, tribes, communities, and local organizations. They support the provision of quality behavioral-health services such as addiction-prevention, treatment, and recovery-support services through competitive Programs of Regional and National Significance grants. Several staff offices support the Centers:
 Office of the Administrator
 Office of Policy, Planning, and Innovation
 Office of Behavioral Health Equity
 Office of Financial Resources
 Office of Management, Technology, and Operations
 Office of Communications
 Office of Tribal Affairs and Policy

Center for Mental Health Services
The Center for Mental Health Services (CMHS) is a unit of the Substance Abuse and Mental Health Services Administration (SAMHSA) within the U.S. Department of Health and Human Services.  This U.S. government agency describes its role as: 
The Center for Mental Health Services leads federal efforts to promote the prevention and treatment of mental disorders. Congress created CMHS to bring new hope to adults who have serious mental illness and children with emotional disorders. Wednesday, March 4, 2020 

, the director of CMHS is Paolo del Vecchio.

CMHS is the driving force behind the largest US children's mental health initiative to date, which is focused on creating and sustaining systems of care. This initiative provides grants (now cooperative agreements) to States, political subdivisions of States, territories, Indian Tribes and tribal organizations to improve and expand their Systems Of Care to meet the needs of the focus population—children and adolescents with serious emotional, behavioral, or mental disorders. The Children's Mental Health Initiative is the largest Federal commitment to children’s mental health to date, and through FY 2006, it has provided over $950 million to support SOC development in 126 communities.

Center for Substance Abuse Prevention
The Center for Substance Abuse Prevention (CSAP) aims to reduce the use of illegal substances and the abuse of legal ones.

CSAP promotes self-esteem and cultural pride as a way to reduce the attractiveness of drugs, advocates raising taxes as a way to discourage drinking alcohol by young people, develops alcohol and drug curricula, and funds research on alcohol and drug abuse prevention. CSAP encourages the use of "evidence-based programs" for drug and alcohol prevention. Evidence-based programs are programs that have been rigorously and scientifically evaluated to show effectiveness in reducing or preventing drug use.

The current director of CSAP is Frances Harding.

History and legal definition
CSAP was established in 1992 from the previous Office of Substance Abuse Prevention by the law called the ADAMHA Reorganization Act. Defining regulations include those of Title 42.

Center for Substance Abuse Treatment
The Center for Substance Abuse Treatment (CSAT) was established in October 1992 with a Congressional mandate to expand the availability of effective treatment and recovery services for alcohol and drug problems. CSAT supports a variety of activities aimed at fulfilling its mission: 
 To improve the lives of individuals and families affected by alcohol and drug abuse by ensuring access to clinically sound, cost-effective addiction treatment that reduces the health and social costs to our communities and the nation. 
CSAT works with States and community-based groups to improve and expand existing substance abuse treatment services under the Substance Abuse Prevention and Treatment Block Grant Program. CSAT also supports SAMHSA’s free treatment referral service to link people with the community-based substance abuse services they need. Because no single treatment approach is effective for all persons, CSAT supports the nation's effort to provide multiple treatment modalities, evaluate treatment effectiveness, and use evaluation results to enhance treatment and recovery approaches.

The current director of CSAT is Louis A. Trevisan, MD

Center for Behavioral Health Statistics and Quality
The Center for Behavioral Health Statistics and Quality (CBHSQ) conducts data collection and research on "behavioral health statistics" relating to mental health, addiction, substance use, and related epidemiology. CBHSQ is headed by a Director. Subunits of CBHSQ include:
 Office of Program Analysis and Coordination
 Division of Surveillance and Data Collection
 Division of Evaluation, Analysis and Quality

The Center's headquarters are outside of Rockville, Maryland.

Regional offices
CMS has its headquarters outside of Rockville, Maryland with 10 regional offices located throughout the United States:

 Region I – Boston, Massachusetts
Connecticut, Massachusetts, Maine, New Hampshire, Rhode Island and Vermont.
 Region II – New York, New York
New York State, New Jersey, U.S. Virgin Islands and Puerto Rico.
 Region III – Philadelphia, Pennsylvania
Delaware, Maryland, Pennsylvania, Virginia, West Virginia and the District of Columbia.
 Region IV – Atlanta, Georgia
Alabama, Florida, Georgia, Kentucky, Mississippi, North Carolina, South Carolina and Tennessee.
 Region V – Chicago, Illinois
Illinois, Indiana, Michigan, Minnesota, Ohio and Wisconsin.

 Region VI – Dallas, Texas
Arkansas, Louisiana, New Mexico, Oklahoma and Texas.
 Region VII – Kansas City, Missouri
Iowa, Kansas, Missouri, and Nebraska.
 Region VIII – Denver, Colorado
Colorado, Montana, North Dakota, South Dakota, Utah, and Wyoming.
 Region IX – San Francisco, California
Arizona, California, Hawaii, Nevada, American Samoa, Guam, and the Northern Marina Islands.
 Region X – Seattle, Washington
Alaska, Idaho, Oregon, and Washington

Strategic Direction
In 2010, SAMHSA identified 8 Strategic Initiatives to focus the Agency's work. Below are the 8 areas and goals associated with each category:
 Prevention of Substance Abuse and Mental Illness – Create prevention-prepared communities in which individuals, families, schools, workplaces, and communities take action to promote emotional health; and, to prevent and reduce mental illness, substance (including tobacco) abuse, and, suicide, across the lifespan
 Trauma and Justice – Reduce the pervasive, harmful, and costly public-health impacts of violence and trauma by integrating trauma-informed approaches throughout health and behavioral healthcare systems; also, to divert people with substance-abuse and mental disorders away from criminal-/juvenile-justice systems, and into trauma-informed treatment and recovery. 
 Military Families – Active, Guard, Reserve, and Veteran – Support of our service men & women, and their families and communities, by leading efforts to ensure needed behavioral health services are accessible to them, and successful outcomes.
 Health Reform – Broaden health coverage and the use of evidence-based practices to increase access to appropriate and high quality care; also, to reduce existing disparities between: the availability of substance abuse and mental disorders; and, those for other medical conditions.
 Housing and Homelessness – To provide housing for, and to reduce the barriers to accessing recovery-sustaining programs for, homeless persons with mental and substance abuse disorders (and their families) 
 Health Information Technology for Behavioral Health Providers – To ensure that the behavioral-health provider network—including prevention specialists and consumer providers—fully participate with the general healthcare delivery system, in the adoption of health information technology.
 Data, Outcomes, and Quality – Demonstrating Results – Realize an integrated data strategy that informs policy, measures program impact, and results in improved quality of services and outcomes for individuals, families, and communities.
 Public Awareness and Support – Increase understanding of mental and substance abuse prevention & treatment services, to achieve the full potential of prevention, and, to help people recognize and seek assistance for these health conditions with the same urgency as any other health condition.

Their budget for the Fiscal Year 2010 was about $3.6 billion.  It was re-authorized for FY2011.  Most recently, the FY 2016 Budget requests $3.7 billion for SAMHSA, an increase of $45 million above FY 2015.

Controversy
In February 2004, the administration was accused of requiring the name change of an Oregon mental health conference from "Suicide Prevention Among Gay/Lesbian/Bisexual/Transgender Individuals" to "Suicide Prevention in Vulnerable Populations."

In 2002, then-President George W. Bush established the New Freedom Commission on Mental Health.  The resulting report was intended to provide the foundation for the federal government's Mental Health Services programs.  However, many experts and advocates were highly critical of its report, Achieving the Promise: Transforming Mental Health Care in America.

See also
Addiction recovery groups
Self-help groups for mental health
Treatment Improvement Protocols
United States Department of Health and Human Services

Notes

References

External links

Substance Abuse and Mental Health Services Administration in the Federal Register
 Health Surveillance and Program Support account on USAspending.gov
 Mental Health account on USAspending.gov
 Substance Abuse Treatment account on USAspending.gov
 Substance Abuse Prevention account on USAspending.gov

Agencies of the United States Public Health Service
Addiction organizations in the United States
Mental health organizations in Maryland
1992 establishments in the United States